Michael N. Mautner (born February 19, 1942 in Budapest, Hungary) is a researcher in physical chemistry, astrobiology and astroecology.

Education 
He received his B.Sc. from Hebrew University in 1966,
his M. Sc. from Georgetown University in 1968, and
his Ph.D. from Rockefeller University (with F. H. Field) in 1975.

Professional affiliations 
Mautner served as associate and assistant professor at the Rockefeller University, adjunct professor and senior fellow at the University of Canterbury, Marsden Fellow and Senior Research Fellow Lincoln University, and Research Chemist at the National Institute of Standards and Technology. He currently serves as research professor at Virginia Commonwealth University. He served on the editorial boards of "Space Science and Resources" and  "Astrobiology", and member of the Chemistry Board and Space Settlement Board of the Lifeboat Foundation.

In 1995, he founded the volunteer-based The Panspermia Society (Society for Life in Space - SOLIS), that aims to expand life in space by directed panspermia missions. The SOLIS program is motivated by biotic ethics that value our family of self-propagating gene/protein life, and panbiotic ethics that seeks to start life in new solar systems.

See also
Astroecology
Gas phase ion chemistry
Directed panspermia

References

External links
 Vita, publications and contacts
 Panspermia Society
 index
 AstroEthics
 Professor: We have a 'moral obligation' to seed universe with life

1942 births
Living people
People from Richmond, Virginia
American physical chemists
Hungarian emigrants to the United States
Astrobiologists
Scientists from Virginia